Reginald Cooper was an Argentine rugby union footballer, who played as scrum-half for the Buenos Aires F.C., and the Argentina national team.

Career 
Cooper began his career in the Buenos Aires F.C. He made his international debut with Argentina in a test match against the British Lions in 1927, when the team toured on Argentina for second time.

In 1928 Cooper was the appointed captain of Argentina by his coach Antonio Bilbao La Vieja.

References 

Argentina international rugby union players
Argentine rugby union players
Rugby union players from Buenos Aires
Argentine people of English descent
Rugby union scrum-halves